The Ramon Magsaysay Award (Filipino: Gawad Ramon Magsaysay) is an annual award established to perpetuate former Philippine President Ramon Magsaysay's example of integrity in governance, courageous service to the people, and pragmatic idealism within a democratic society. The prize was established in April 1957 by the trustees of the Rockefeller Brothers Fund based in New York City with the concurrence of the Philippine government. It is often called the "Nobel Peace Prize of Asia".

History
The award is named after Ramon Magsaysay, the seventh president of the Republic of the Philippines after World War II. This has generated criticism due to allegations of brutal suppression of dissent and subserviency to the US government during Magsaysay's tenure as defence secretary and president.

In May 1957, seven prominent Filipinos were named to the founding board of trustees of the Ramon Magsaysay Award Foundation, the non-profit corporation tasked with implementing the awards program. Later on, the board of trustees diversified and included prominent Asians from all over the Asian continent and outlying islands. The Ramon Magsaysay Award Foundation gives the prize to Asian individuals achieving excellence in their respective fields.

The award recognizes and honors individuals and organizations in Asia regardless of race, creed, sex, or nationality, who have achieved distinction in their respective fields and have helped others generously without anticipating public recognition.  

The awards used to be given in six categories, five of which were discontinued in 2009:
 Government Service (1958–2008)
 Public Service (1958–2008)
 Community Leadership (1958–2008)
 Journalism, Literature, and Creative Communication Arts (1958–2008)
 Peace and International Understanding (1958–2008)
 Emergent Leadership (2001– )
 Uncategorized (2009– )

Awardees 
The winners of the Ramon Magsaysay Awards come from different parts of Asia, although there are some instances where the winners came from countries outside Asia who had served, worked or accomplished something in different Asian countries. As of 2021, recipients have come from twenty-two Asian countries.

The following is a partial list of the awardees of the Ramon Magsaysay Award. Awardees' individual nationality or country of origin and citizenship are indicated.

Starting 2009, the Award is no longer being given in fixed categories except for Emergent Leadership.

Government Service (1958–2008)

Public Service (1958–2008)

Community Leadership (1958–2008)

Journalism, Literature, and the Creative Communication Arts (1958–2008)

Peace and International Understanding (1958–2008)

Emergent Leadership (2001–present)

Uncategorized (2009–present)

References

Further reading

External links
 Ramon Magsaysay Award Foundation
 Ramon Magsaysay Award Foundation News 

Peace awards
Humanitarian and service awards
Journalism awards
1957 establishments in the Philippines
Philippine awards
Awards established in 1957
Ramon Magsaysay